Auto Driver is a 2015 documentary film directed by Meena Longjam. It tells the story of Laibi Oinam who took to driving a second-hand auto rickshaw in 2011, in a non-traditional profession for women in the Imphal city of Manipur, in order to support her ailing husband and sons' education. Produced over three years, it won the best social issue film in the non-feature category at the 63rd National Film Awards in 2015 and Best Short Documentary in the Audience Choice category at the 2017 Women's Voices Now Film Festival.

Cast
 Laibi Oinam

References

2015 films
2015 documentary films